"Are You with Me" is a song originally recorded by Easton Corbin and later remixed by Lost Frequencies.

Are You with Me may also refer to:

 "Are You with Me" (The Potbelleez song)
 Are You with Me? (album), a 1996 album by Cowboy Mouth
 "Are You with Me", a song by Mickie James
 "Are You with Me", a song by Sixx:A.M. from This Is Gonna Hurt
 "Are You with Me", a song by Vaux from Beyond Virtue, Beyond Vice